Michael Arthur Herrera is an American singer, songwriter and musician best known as the lead vocalist, bassist and songwriter for the punk rock band MxPx. He is also the frontman of Tumbledown and the bassist of Goldfinger.

Early life
Herrera was born in Bremerton, Washington to Art and Michele Herrera and is of Mexican and English / Welsh descent. He is the middle of three children and has an older sister and a younger sister. His parents live in Bremerton in the house he grew up in. He grew up playing guitar, inspired by listening to country and punk rock music. Herrera started MxPx while he was in high school with friends Andy Husted and Yuri Ruley with the band's first performance in his back yard.

Career

MxPx
Herrera is the primary songwriter, vocalist and bassist in MxPx. Herrera started the band with Andy Husted and Yuri Ruley in mid-1992, just before starting high school.

Mike Herrera solo

As MxPx became less active in the late 2000s, Herrera increasingly appeared as a solo act. These performances include both MxPx and Tumbledown songs, and are generally performed with only vocals and acoustic guitar, though Herrera is occasionally joined by one or two others, including at times Kris Roe of the Ataris.

In Herrera's own Monkey Trench Studio, he recorded Live In the Basement, consisting of six Tumbledown songs, five MxPx songs, and a cover of the Beatles' "I've Just Seen a Face". The album was released digitally with a limited CD pressing. Live online performances are also available as digital albums, Live&Raw on StageIT.com and Live.Web.Feb.4.2013. Live in Southampton was released to MxPx fanclub members only.

Tumbledown

Herrera started the band Mike Herrera's Tumbledown with guitarist Jack Parker, bassist Marshall Trotland, and drummer Harley Trotland. The band draws influences from being on tour as well as from "great American songwriters" such as Hank Williams, Willie Nelson and Johnny Cash. The sound of Tumbledown differs greatly from MxPx, taking a lighter, more country inspired sound.

Side projects and production

Herrera  has produced albums such as At Any Rate by Too Bad Eugene and Future Plans Undecided by Element (101). He sang backing vocals on "Radio #2" from the Ataris' album So Long, Astoria and "Runaway" by Amber Pacific, on the group's album Truth in Sincerity and shared lead vocals Stephen Egerton's album, The Seven Degrees of Stephen Egerton.

In addition to Tumbledown, Herrera was the frontman of Arthur (MxPx with the band's former bass tech Neil Hundt), having released a six-song EP and a full length album before disbanding, as well as the Cootees (Mike Herrera, Jiles Brandon, Tom Wisniewski, and Dale Yob), a Tooth & Nail side project in the mid-1990s.

Herrera opened Monkey Trench studio in Bremerton in 2008.

In 2016, Herrera was recruited by John Feldmann to join ska punk band Goldfinger as the group's new bassist. His first single with the band is "Put The Knife Away", which was released on May 24, 2017.

Equipment

Herrera endorses Music Man StingRay basses and Ernie Ball strings and has used them on almost every MxPx recording. For amplification he uses a Hartke LH1000 head and a Hartke 8x10 cabinet. Herrera is also endorsed by Takamine acoustic guitars, Sparrow guitars, Mesa Boogie amps, Samson Tech, Hartke and Latin percussion.

In March 2020 Ernie Ball announced a new Mike Herrera signature Music Man StingRay bass featuring an ash body, maple neck, Schaller tuners, and a unique electronics configuration, being the pickups are wired directly to the input jack with three "dummy" knobs for aesthetic purposes.

Personal life
Herrera married his wife Holli in 2001 and together they have two children. In 2017 the Herreras moved from Washington to Waco, Texas (Holli's home state) and appeared in Season 5, Episode 18 HGTV of the HGTV series Fixer Upper in which their new home was renovated and decorated for the show.

As of 2015, Herrera has said he is no longer Christian and identifies as an agnostic.

Discography 

With MxPx
 Pokinatcha (1994)
 Teenage Politics (1995)
 Life in General (1996)
 Slowly Going the Way of the Buffalo (1998)
 The Ever Passing Moment (2000)
 Before Everything & After (2003)
 Panic (2005)
 Secret Weapon (2007)
 On the Cover II (2009)
 Punk Rawk Christmas (2009)
 Plans Within Plans (2012)
 MxPx (2018)

As a producer
 Marine View Drive – Five Days Down EP (2010), producer and engineer, vocals on "Let's Go Out"
 The Water Tower Bucket Boys – Sole Kitchen (2010), producer and engineer, vocals on "Blackbird Pickin' At a Squirrel"

References

External links
 Mike Herrera on Twitter

20th-century American bass guitarists
American people of English descent
American musicians of Mexican descent
American people of Welsh descent
American punk rock guitarists
Pop punk singers
Living people
American punk rock singers
People from Bremerton, Washington
Singers from Washington (state)
American performers of Christian music
American former Christians
American agnostics
Guitarists from Washington (state)
21st-century American singers
21st-century American bass guitarists
Date of birth missing (living people)
1976 births